A presidential referendum took place in Iraq on October 16, 2002. It was the second presidential election under the rule of Saddam Hussein (the first having taken place in 1995). According to official statistics, the turnout was 100%, with all 11,445,638 Iraqis registered to vote having voted "yes" in a referendum whether to support another seven year-term for President Saddam Hussein, which would legally have ended in 2009.

Results

Sources
BBC.co.uk: Saddam 'wins 100% of vote', 16 october 2002

2002 elections in Iraq
Iraq
Elections in Iraq
Referendums in Iraq
Saddam Hussein
Single-candidate elections
October 2002 events in Iraq